The Delaware Historical Society began in 1864 as an effort to preserve documents from the Civil War.  Since then, it has expanded into a statewide historical institution with several buildings, including Old Town Hall and the Delaware History Museum, in Wilmington and the historic Read House & Gardens in New Castle.

The society participates in joint marketing with the Delaware Tourism Office, the Greater Wilmington Convention & Visitors Bureau, and the Brandywine Museums & Gardens Alliance.

Delaware History Center

The Society's Wilmington Campus is located between 5th and 6th Streets on Lower Market Street in Wilmington.  This row is the historic shopping district and currently markets itself as the LoMa Design District to promote urban redevelopment.  The complex includes an arch over the street.

Delaware History Museum
The main museum consists of two permanent exhibit halls in a converted 1941 art deco Woolworth's store, one of two that used to operate on Market Street.  Exhibits include “Delaware: One State, Many Stories,” Discover Delaware and the Jane and Littleton Mitchell Center for African American Heritage.

Old Town Hall

The Old Town Hall served as the city hall for the Burough and later City of Wilmington.  Constructed in 1798 in the federal style, the building also included the jail and library.  The Marquis de Lafayette received a reception there and President Andrew Jackson was the guest of honor at a dinner. In 1851, the body of Senator Henry Clay was officially laid in state.

Willingtown Square

Willingtown Square is a collection of buildings relocated from other sections of downtown to make way for high rise construction.  Started as part of the bicentennial celebration in 1976, the square is named after Thomas Willing, the founder of Wilmington.

The buildings' interiors serve as office and meeting space for the society but patrons can access the courtyard and grounds.

Library and research center

The society provides free access to a research library with unique special collections.  The collection includes work on Delaware genealogy, maps, and underground railroad as well as a letter from George Washington to Caesar Rodney. Senator William V. Roth's widow donated all of his papers to the library. The library is open Mondays from 1pm to 9pm, Tuesdays and Thursdays from 9am to 1pm, Fridays from 9am to 5pm, and the third Saturday of every month from 10am to 4pm.

Located at 505 North Market Street, a former Artisans Savings Bank branch location houses the library. Tilghman Ware Company built the art deco structure in 1930–31.

Read House and gardens

Located in New Castle on the Strand, the George Read II House was built in 1801 by George Read, Jr., the son of George Read, a signer of the Declaration of Independence. The house was the largest in the state at the time it was built with 22 rooms covering . The house also includes a rathskeller in the basement that served as a speakeasy. This dates from the 1920s when the Laird family owned the house and were bootleggers.  The house was restored in 1986.

See also
 Hagley Museum and Library
 History of Delaware
 Stonum
 List of museums in Delaware
 National Register of Historic Places listings in Wilmington, Delaware
 Delaware Art Museum

References

External links
 Delaware Historical Society
 Brandywine 10
 Downtown Wilmington 
 The LoMa Design District
 NRHP District Listing with Photos
 NRHP Town Hall Listing with Photos
 NRHP Jacob Dingee House with Photos
 NRHP Obidiah Dingee House with Photos

State historical societies of the United States
Museums established in 1864
Brandywine Museums & Gardens Alliance
Historic house museums in Delaware
New Castle, Delaware
Buildings and structures on the National Register of Historic Places in Delaware
Historic districts in Delaware
Buildings and structures in Wilmington, Delaware
F. W. Woolworth Company buildings and structures
Museums in Wilmington, Delaware
History museums in Delaware
Libraries in Delaware
Historical societies in Delaware
Clock towers in Delaware
National Register of Historic Places in Wilmington, Delaware
1864 establishments in Delaware